Alison Bechdel (born September 10, 1960) is an American cartoonist. Originally known for the long-running comic strip Dykes to Watch Out For, she came to critical and commercial success in 2006 with her graphic memoir Fun Home, which was subsequently adapted as a musical that won a Tony Award for Best Musical in 2015. In 2012, she released her second graphic memoir Are You My Mother? She was a 2014 recipient of the MacArthur "Genius" Award. She is also known for originating the Bechdel test.

Early life 
Bechdel was born in Lock Haven, Pennsylvania. She is the daughter of Helen Augusta (née Fontana) and Bruce Allen Bechdel. Her family was Roman Catholic. Her father was an army veteran who was stationed in West Germany. He was also a high school English teacher, working full-time and operating a funeral home part-time. Her mother was an actress and teacher. Both of her parents contributed to her career as a cartoonist. She has two brothers, Bruce "Christian" Bechdel II and John Bechdel, a keyboard player who has worked with many bands including Fear Factory, Ministry, Prong and Killing Joke. Bechdel left high school a year early and earned her A.A. in 1979 from Bard College at Simon's Rock. She graduated with a degree in studio arts and art history in 1981 from Oberlin College. After her father died in 1980, her mother sold the family house, in Beech Creek, Pennsylvania, the small town where Bechdel grew up, and moved to Bellefonte, a less provincial small town near State College with her long-time partner Dr. Robert Fenichel.

Career 

Bechdel moved to Manhattan during the summer of 1981 and applied to several art schools, but was rejected and worked in many office jobs in the publishing industry.

She began Dykes to Watch Out For as a single drawing labeled "Marianne, dissatisfied with the morning brew: Dykes to Watch Out For, plate no. 27". An acquaintance recommended she send her work to WomaNews, a feminist newspaper, which published her first work in its June 1983 issue. Bechdel gradually moved from her early single-panel drawings to multi-paneled strips. Dykes to Watch Out For began this process, developing into a series of posters and postcards, allowing for people to have a look into the urban lesbian community. After a year, other outlets began running the strip.

In the first years, Dykes to Watch Out For consisted of unconnected strips without a regular cast or serialized storyline. However, its structure eventually evolved into a focus on following a set group of lesbian characters. In 1986, Firebrand Books published a collection of the strips to date. In 1987, Bechdel introduced her regular characters, Mo and her friends, while living in St. Paul, Minnesota. Dykes to Watch Out For is the origin of the "Bechdel test", which has become a frequently used metric in cultural discussion of film. In 1988, she began a short-lived page-length strip about the staff of a queer newspaper, titled "Servants to the Cause", for The Advocate. Bechdel has also written and drawn autobiographical strips and has done illustrations for magazines and websites. The success of Dykes to Watch Out For allowed Bechdel to quit her day job in 1990 to work on the strip full-time.

In November 2006, Bechdel was invited to sit on the Usage Panel of the American Heritage Dictionary. In 2012, Bechdel was a Mellon Residential Fellow for Arts and Practice at the Richard and Mary L. Gray Center at the University of Chicago and co-taught "Lines of Transmission: Comics & Autobiography" with Professor Hillary Chute. On April 6, 2017, Bechdel was appointed as Vermont's third Cartoonist Laureate.

In 2014, she posted a comic strip based on her Fun Home! The Musical! After Donald Trump's election as U.S. president she posted three new episodes of Dykes to Watch Out For: "Pièce de Résistance," "Postcards From the Edge," and "Things Fall Apart."

Bechdel resides in Bolton, Vermont, and works with the Vermont-based alternative weekly Seven Days.

Graphic novels

Fun Home 

In 2006, Bechdel published Fun Home: A Family Tragicomic, an autobiographical "tragicomic" chronicling her childhood and the years before and after her father's suicide. It follows both the past and present regarding the relationship she shares with her parents, specifically her father. Additionally, this graphic memoir helps show the hardships individuals face when coming out. Fun Home has received more widespread mainstream attention than Bechdel's earlier work, with reviews in Entertainment Weekly, People and several features in The New York Times. Fun Home spent two weeks on The New York Times Bestseller List for Hardcover Nonfiction.

Fun Home was hailed as one of the best books of 2006 by numerous sources, including The New York Times, amazon.com, The Times of London, Publishers Weekly, salon.com, New York magazine, and Entertainment Weekly.

Time magazine named Alison Bechdel's Fun Home number one of its "10 Best Books of the Year." Lev Grossman and Richard LeCayo described Fun Home as "the unlikeliest literary success of 2006," and called it "a stunning memoir about a girl growing up in a small town with her cryptic, perfectionist dad and slowly realizing that a) she is gay and b) he is too… Bechdel's breathtakingly smart commentary duets with eloquent line drawings. Forget genre and sexual orientation: this is a masterpiece about two people who live in the same house but different worlds, and their mysterious debts to each other."

Fun Home was a finalist for the 2006 National Book Critics Circle Award in the memoir/autobiography category. It also won the 2007 Eisner Award for Best Reality-Based Work. Fun Home was also nominated for the Best Graphic Album award, and Bechdel was nominated for Best Writer/Artist.

In 2014, the Republican-led South Carolina House of Representatives Ways and Means Committee considered cutting the College of Charleston's funding by $52,000, the cost of the summer reading program for selecting Fun Home for a reading program.

Fun Home premiered as a musical Off-Broadway at The Public Theater on September 30, 2013, and opened officially on October 22, 2013. The score was by Jeanine Tesori and the book and lyrics were written by Lisa Kron. Kron and Tesori made history as the first all-woman team to win a Tony Award for best score. Originally scheduled to run through November 3, 2013, the run was extended multiple times and the musical closed on January 12, 2014. The Public Theater production was directed by Sam Gold. Sets and costumes were by David Zinn, lighting by Ben Stanton, sound by Kai Harada, projections by Jim Findlay and Jeff Sugg and choreography by Danny Mefford. The musical played at Broadway's Circle in the Square Theatre, with previews from March 27, 2015, and an official opening on April 19, 2015, running to September 10, 2016. Sam Gold, who directed the Public Theater production, also directed the show on Broadway, leading the Off-Broadway production team. The Off-Broadway cast reprised their roles on Broadway, except for the actors playing John, Christian, and Medium Alison. The Broadway musical won five Tony Awards, including Best Musical, Best Performance by an Actor in Leading Role in a Musical, Best Original Score (Music and/or Lyrics) Written for the Theatre, Best Book of a Musical, and Best Direction of a Musical.

On January 3, 2020, it was announced that Jake Gyllenhaal and his Nine Stories Productions banner secured the rights to adapt the musical version of Fun Home into a film. Sam Gold, who directed the Broadway production, is set to helm the film, in which Gyllenhaal will star as Bruce Bechdel.

Are You My Mother? 

Bechdel suspended work on Dykes to Watch Out For in 2008 so that she could work on her second graphic memoir, Are You My Mother?: A Comic Drama, which was released in May 2012. It focuses on her relationship with her mother. Bechdel described its themes as "the self, subjectivity, desire, the nature of reality, that sort of thing," which is a paraphrase of a quote from Virginia Woolf's To the Lighthouse.

The story's dramatic action is multi-layered and divides into a number of narrative strands:
Bechdel's phone-conversations with her mother in the present.
Bechdel's memories of interactions with her mother throughout her life, beginning in childhood.
Bechdel's therapy sessions, whose primary content is composed of analysis of her relationship with her mother.
Bechdel's richly imagined, and diligently researched, historical portrayals of psychoanalyst Donald Winnicott, and author Virginia Woolf, spliced together with Bechdel's own therapeutic journey with text from the psychoanalytic writings of Alice Miller, along with the story of Bechdel's own reading-through and relating to the works of Sigmund Freud.

An excerpt of the book, entitled "Mirror", was included in the Best American Comics 2013, edited by Jeff Smith. This episode riffs heavily on psychoanalytic themes quoted explicitly from the work of psychoanalysts Alice Miller and Donald Winnicott.

The Secret to Superhuman Strength 
Bechdel published another memoir The Secret to Superhuman Strength in 2021.

Personal life 
Bechdel came out as a lesbian at age 19. Her sexuality and gender non-conformity are a large part of the core message of her work, and has said that "the secret subversive goal of my work is to show that women, not just lesbians, are regular human beings". In February 2004, Bechdel married Amy Rubin, her girlfriend since 1992, in a civil ceremony in San Francisco. However, all same-sex marriage licenses given by the city at that time were subsequently voided by the California Supreme Court. Bechdel and Rubin separated in 2006. She subsequently lived with her partner Holly Rae Taylor, a painter, for seven and a half years before their marriage in July 2015. She lives in Bolton, Vermont, in a house she bought in 1996, adding her own studio to work in.

Selected works 
 The Essential Dykes to Watch Out For (Houghton Mifflin, 2008)
 Fun Home: A Family Tragicomic (Houghton Mifflin, 2006)
 Are You My Mother?: A Comic Drama (Houghton Mifflin Harcourt, 2012)
 The Secret to Superhuman Strength (Houghton Mifflin Harcourt, 2021)

Awards 
 Time Magazine listed Fun Home as one of its 10 Best Books of the Year for 2006
 Eisner Award for Best Reality-Based Work in 2007
 Stonewall Book Awards – Israel Fishman Non-Fiction Award in 2007.
 Guggenheim Fellowship, 2012
 Inkpot Award, 2012
 The Bill Whitehead Award for Lifetime Achievement from Publishing Triangle in 2012.
 The International Forum for Psychoanalytic Education Distinguished Educator Award in 2013
 A MacArthur Fellowship in 2014.
 Lambda Board of Trustees Award for Excellence in Literature in 2014.
 The Erikson Institute Prize for Excellence in Mental Health Media in 2015.
 Harvey Awards 2019 Hall of Fame inductee. The award was presented to Bechdel by Chip Kidd during the Harvey Awards at New York Comic Con.

For her outstanding contributions to the comic art form, Comics Alliance listed Bechdel as one of twelve women cartoonists deserving of lifetime achievement recognition.

See also 

Female comics creators
Comics

References

Further reading

External links 

 
 Alison Bechdel from Toons Mag
 
 Alison Bechdel papers at the Sophia Smith Collection, Smith College Special Collections
 Seven Days (newspaper)
 Interview on Vermont PBS Profile

1960 births
Living people
20th-century American artists
20th-century American women writers
21st-century American artists
21st-century American novelists
21st-century American women writers
Alternative cartoonists
American Splendor artists
American comic strip cartoonists
American female comics artists
American feminist writers
American graphic novelists
American women novelists
Artists from Burlington, Vermont
Artists from Pennsylvania
Female comics writers
Feminist artists
LGBT comics creators
American LGBT novelists
LGBT people from Pennsylvania
Lambda Literary Award winners
Stonewall Book Award winners
Lesbian memoirists
Lesbian novelists
Lesbian feminists
American lesbian writers
American lesbian artists
MacArthur Fellows
Novelists from Pennsylvania
Oberlin College alumni
People from Clinton County, Pennsylvania
The New Yorker cartoonists
Inkpot Award winners
21st-century American LGBT people